Die Mörder sind unter uns, a German film known in English as Murderers Among Us in the United States or The Murderers Are Among Us in the United Kingdom was one of the first post-World War II German films and the first Trümmerfilm. It was produced in 1945/46 in the Althoff Studios in Babelsberg and the Jofa-Ateliers in Johannisthal. The film was written and directed by Wolfgang Staudte.

Plot
Berlin in 1945 after Germany's defeat in the war. The former military surgeon Dr. Hans Mertens (Ernst Wilhelm Borchert) stumbles down the street, drunk. He suffers from flashbacks of the war and has an aversion to people in pain, which prevents him from practicing medicine. Instead, he spends his days drinking. An artist and Nazi concentration camp survivor, Susanne Wallner (Hildegard Knef), finds him living in her apartment as she returns home.

They reluctantly live together at first, then become friends. Susanne finds a letter to a Mrs. Brückner in the apartment and confronts Mertens about it. Mertens tries to get a job at a hospital, but a screaming woman gives him flashbacks and he is left incapacitated. Meanwhile, Susanne meets with Ferdinand Brückner (Arno Paulsen). When Mertens returns, Susanne informs him that Brückner is alive and well. Mertens visits Brückner, his former captain, and stays for dinner. Brückner is now a successful businessman, producing pots out of old Stahlhelme, the German military steel helmet. After the dinner, Brückner returns to Mertens his gun from the war. Mertens has another flashback and goes home drunk.

Soon after, Mertens decides to kill Brückner. He leads Brückner away under the pretense of going to a bar and takes him along a purportedly shorter route, through the rubble and abandoned buildings of Berlin. When he thinks they are alone, he draws his gun. As he does so, a woman in need of a doctor runs out of one of the ruined buildings. Brückner tells her that Mertens is a doctor, but Mertens is reluctant to help. The woman tells him her only child stopped breathing an hour before, and he goes along with her, while Brückner leaves for the bar alone. Mertens performs a tracheotomy on the girl, then Mertens returns home and proclaims his love for Susanne.

The film skips forward to Christmas Eve. Susanne and Mertens are still living together, and Mertens is now a practicing surgeon. Mertens tells Susanne he has to finish something. He goes to Brückner's factory, where Brückner and his employees are singing Christmas carols. Mertens has a flashback, which reveals that Brückner had ordered the shooting of over a hundred civilians on Christmas Eve of 1942 in a Polish village on the Eastern Front. Mertens tries to kill Brückner again, but Susanne stops him at the last minute. Instead of killing Brückner they denounce him and he is put on trial for war crimes.

Filming
To get permission for the film, Staudte had gone to the British, the French, and the Americans, but they all rejected the proposal, citing its political nature as the reason for refusing to grant the film a license. The Soviets, on the other hand, accepted the script with a change to the film's ending. Originally the film was supposed to be named Der Mann den ich töten werde (The Man I will kill) and Mertens was supposed to succeed in killing Brückner, but the script and the title were changed because the Soviets were afraid that viewers could interpret that as a call for vigilante justice. The title alludes to the initial title of Fritz Lang's 1931 classic M, which was to be called Mörder unter uns (Murderer Among Us).

The Murderers Among Us debuted on 15 October 1946 in the Admiralspalast, which was at the time the home of the Berlin State Opera, in the Soviet sector. The television debut in the German Democratic Republic was on 1 November 1955 and in the Federal Republic on 18 November 1971.

Denazification 
In the post-war period, it was a goal of both the American and the Soviet authorities to reeducate the German public. For the Americans, this meant exporting American films to West Germany. For the Soviets, this meant the establishment of DEFA. The Soviets believed film could be used to reeducate the public. With The Murderers Are Among Us, the aim was to urge the public to judge those responsible for the atrocities committed during the war. Angel Wagenstein, a Bulgarian director, said, “For me [Staudte] was the first ambassador, who through his film renewed our faith in a nation capable of self-reflection, of looking into the mirror and acknowledging its own guilt, of making a confession that very few nations would be able to make.”

Ernst Wilhelm Borchert was removed from advertisements for the movie because he had been accused and arrested for lying on denazification paperwork, but an article published in the Neue Zeit in 1947 later reported that he’d been exonerated by the Denazification Commission for Artists.

Reception
The picture sold 6,468,921 tickets.

Most of the reviews were positive, although some criticized the fact that the characters appeared in modern and trendy clothes, which did not reflect the reality of the living conditions of Berliners in the immediate post-war period. In this film, Staudte was not only dealing with Germany's past, but also with his own, as he had been involved in the filming of the Nazi propaganda film Jud Süß.

See also
Cinema of Germany

References

The Murderers are among us in progress-film.de, the distributor of the complete DEFA film heritage
Die Mörder sind unter uns, 1946 in filmref.com. Retrieved 2007-01-19.
Murderers Are Among Us, The (Moerder sind unter uns, Die) in German-films.de. Retrieved 2007-01-19.

External links
 Original 1946 posters on Ostfilm.de.
DVD Review on warinfilm.com
 
 
Synopsis and production details

1946 films
1946 drama films
German drama films
East German films
Films directed by Wolfgang Staudte
Films set in Berlin
German black-and-white films
Films about war crimes
Films shot at Althoff Studios
Films shot at Johannisthal Studios
1940s German-language films